Ladislav Šimčo (born 29 May 1967) is a former football player from Slovakia and manager. He previously managed team of Lokomotíva Košice. He was a former manager of MFK Ružomberok in 2012-13 season and in 2011-12 he was MFK Košice head coach. He has son Dominik, also former Lokomotíva Košice player.

Career
Šimčo made 43 appearances in the Czech Gambrinus liga for FC Hradec Králové.

External links
 MFK Ružomberok profile
 Soccerway profile

References

1967 births
Living people
Slovak footballers
Slovak football managers
Slovak expatriate footballers
FC Lokomotíva Košice players
FK Inter Bratislava players
FC Hradec Králové players
FC VSS Košice managers
MFK Ružomberok managers
FC Nitra managers
Slovak Super Liga managers
Expatriate footballers in the Czech Republic
Sportspeople from Košice

Association footballers not categorized by position